Resection may refer to:
Resection (surgery), the removal by surgery of all or part of an organ or other  body structure
Segmental resection (or segmentectomy), the partial removal of an organ or other body structure
Position resection, a means of establishing a location by measuring angles only to known points
Resection (free stationing), a means of establishing a position and orientation of a total station by measuring angles and distances to known points
DNA end resection, the process of cutting away the 5' side of a blunt end of double-stranded DNA